The Hertfordshire Presidents' Tankard is an annual rugby union knock-out club competition organized by the Hertfordshire Rugby Football Union.  It was first introduced during the 2010-11 season, with the inaugural winners being St Albans.  It is the second most important rugby union cup competition in Hertfordshire, behind the Hertfordshire Presidents' Cup but ahead of the Hertfordshire Presidents' Trophy. 

The Presidents' Tankard is currently open to the first teams of club sides based in Hertfordshire that play in tier 7 (London 2 North West) and tier 8 (London 3 North West) of the English rugby union league system.  The format is a knockout cup with a preliminary round, first round, semi-finals and a final to be held at Allianz Park (Saracen's home ground) in April-May, on the same date and same venue as the Cup and Trophy finals.

Hertfordshire Presidents' Tankard winners

Number of wins
St Albans (3)
Welwyn (2)
Datchworth (1)
Fullerians (1)
Hemel Hempstead (1)
Stevenage Town (1)
Tabard (1)

See also
 Hertfordshire RFU
 Hertfordshire Presidents' Cup
 Hertfordshire Presidents' Trophy
 English rugby union system
 Rugby union in England

References

External links
 Hertfordshire RFU

Recurring sporting events established in 2010
2010 establishments in England
Rugby union cup competitions in England
Rugby union in Hertfordshire